Tony Joe White (July 23, 1943 – October 24, 2018), nicknamed the Swamp Fox, was an American singer-songwriter and guitarist, best known for his 1969 hit "Polk Salad Annie" and for "Rainy Night in Georgia", which he wrote but which was first made popular by Brook Benton in 1970. He also wrote "Steamy Windows" and "Undercover Agent for the Blues", both hits for Tina Turner in 1989; those two songs came by way of Turner's producer at the time, Mark Knopfler, who was a friend of White. "Polk Salad Annie" was also recorded by Joe Dassin, Elvis Presley, and Tom Jones.

Biography 
Tony Joe White was the youngest of seven children who grew up on a cotton farm near Oak Grove, West Carroll Parish, Louisiana, United States. His song "Old Man Willis" takes place in West Carroll Parish. He first began performing music at school dances, and after graduating from high school he performed in night clubs in Texas and Louisiana.

1960s–1970s 
In 1967, White signed with Monument Records, which operated from a recording studio in the Nashville suburb of Hendersonville, Tennessee, and produced a variety of sounds, including rock and roll, country and western, and rhythm and blues. Billy Swan was his producer on his first three albums.

Over the next three years, White released four singles with no commercial success in the U.S., although "Soul Francisco" was a hit in France. "Polk Salad Annie" had been released for nine months and written off as a failure by his record label when it finally entered the U.S. charts in July 1969. It climbed to the Top Ten by early August and eventually reached No. 8, becoming White's biggest hit.

White's first album, 1969's Black and White, was recorded with Muscle Shoals/Nashville musicians David Briggs, Norbert Putnam, and Jerry Carrigan, and featured "Willie and Laura Mae Jones" and "Polk Salad Annie", along with Jimmy Webb's "Wichita Lineman". "Willie and Laura Mae Jones" was covered by Dusty Springfield and released as a single, later added to reissues of her 1969 album Dusty in Memphis.

Three more singles quickly followed, all minor hits, and White toured with Steppenwolf, Anne Murray, Sly & the Family Stone, Creedence Clearwater Revival and other major rock acts of the 1970s, playing in France, Germany, Belgium, Sweden and England.

In 1973, White appeared in the film Catch My Soul, a rock-opera adaption of Shakespeare's Othello. White played and sang four songs and composed seven for the musical.

In late September 1973, White was recruited by record producer Huey Meaux to sit in on the Memphis sessions that became Jerry Lee Lewis's Southern Roots album. These sessions were a three-day, around-the-clock party, which not only reunited the original MGs (Steve Cropper, Donald "Duck" Dunn and Al Jackson, Jr. of Booker T. and the MGs fame) for the first time in three years, but also featured Carl Perkins, Mark Lindsay (of Paul Revere & the Raiders), and Wayne Jackson plus The Memphis Horns.

1980s 
From 1976 to 1983, White released three more albums, all on different labels. Trying to combine his own swamp-rock sound with the popular disco music at the time, the results were not met with success and White gave up his career as a singer and concentrated on writing songs. During this time frame, he collaborated with American expat Joe Dassin on his only English-language album, Home Made Ice Cream, and its French-language counterpart, Blue Country.

1990s comeback 
In 1989, White produced one non-single track on Tina Turner's Foreign Affair album, the rest of the album being produced by Dan Hartman. Playing a variety of instruments on the album, he also wrote four songs, including the title song and the hit single "Steamy Windows". As a result of this he became managed by Roger Davies, who was Turner's manager at the time, and he obtained a new contract with Polydor.

The resulting album, 1991's Closer to the Truth, was a commercial success and put White back in the spotlight. He released two more albums for Polydor: The Path of a Decent Groove and Lake Placid Blues, which was co-produced by Roger Davies.

In the 1990s, White toured Germany and France with Joe Cocker and Eric Clapton, and in 1992 he played the Montreux Festival. During the late 1990s, White also toured with Waylon Jennings.

In 1996, Tina Turner released the song "On Silent Wings" written by White.

2000s 
In 2000, Hip-O Records released One Hot July in the U.S., giving White his first new major-label domestic release in 17 years. The critically acclaimed The Beginning appeared on Swamp Records in 2001, followed by Heroines, featuring several duets with female vocalists including Jessi Colter, Shelby Lynne, Emmylou Harris, Lucinda Williams, and Michelle White, on Sanctuary in 2004, and a live Austin City Limits concert, Live from Austin, TX, on New West Records in 2006. In 2004, White was the featured guest artist in an episode of the Legends Rock TV Show and Concert Series, produced by Megabien Entertainment.

In 2007, White released another live recording, Take Home the Swamp, as well as the compilation Introduction to Tony Joe White. Elkie Brooks recorded one of White's songs, "Out of The Rain", on her 2005 Electric Lady album. On July 14, 2006, in Magny-Cours, France, White performed as a warm-up act for Roger Waters' The Dark Side of the Moon concert. White's album, entitled Uncovered, was released in September 2006 and featured collaborations with Mark Knopfler, Michael McDonald, Eric Clapton, and J.J. Cale.

The song "Elements and Things" from the 1969 album ...Continued features prominently during the horse-racing scenes in the 2012 HBO television series "Luck".

In 2013, White signed to Yep Roc Records and released Hoodoo. Mother Jones called the album "Steamy, Irresistible" and No Depression noted Tony Joe White is "the real king of the swamp". He also made his Live...with Jools Holland debut in London, playing songs from Hoodoo.

On October 15, 2014, White appeared on The Late Show with David Letterman alongside the Foo Fighters to perform "Polk Salad Annie". Pointing to White, Letterman told his TV audience, "Holy cow! ... If I was this guy, you could all kiss my ass. And I mean that."

In May 2016, Tony Joe White released Rain Crow on Yep Roc Records. The lead track "Hoochie Woman" was co-written with his wife, Leann. The track "Conjure Child" is a follow up to an earlier song, "Conjure Woman".

The album Bad Mouthin''' was released in September 2018 again on Yep Roc Records. The album contains six self-penned songs and five blues standards written by, amongst others, Charley Patton and John Lee Hooker. On the album White also performs a cover of the Elvis Presley song "Heartbreak Hotel". White plays acoustic and electric guitar on the album which was produced by his son Jody White and it has a signature Tony Joe White laidback sound.

The posthumous album Smoke from the Chimney was released May 7, 2021, on Easy Eye Sound. The album features nine vocal and guitar demo recordings of White, fully realized and arranged by producer Dan Auerbach. The tracks feature many top Nashville session players, including drummer Gene Chrisman, keyboardist Bobby Wood, bassist Dave Roe, guitarist Marcus King, and others.

 Death 
White died of a heart attack on October 24, 2018, at the age of 75. "He wasn't ill at all. He just had a heart attack...there was no pain or suffering", said his son, Jody White. He died at his home in Leiper's Fork, Tennessee.

 Discography 

 1969 – Black and White (Monument Records #18114)
 1969 – ...Continued (Monument Records #18133)
 1970 – Tony Joe (Monument Records #18142)
 1971 – The Best Of Tony Joe White (Monument Records #10000) – compilation of the three Monument albums. (No U.S. release)
 1971 – Tony Joe White (Warner Bros. Records #1900)
 1972 – The Train I'm On (Warner Bros. Records #2580)
 1973 – Homemade Ice Cream (Warner Bros. Records #2708)
 1973 – Catch My Soul – original soundtrack (Metromedia Records/RCA #BML1-0176)
 1975 – The Best Of Tony Joe White (Warner Bros. [UK] Records #56149) – compilation of the three Warner Bros. albums.
 1976 – Eyes (20th Century Records #T-523)
 1980 – The Real Thang (Casablanca Records #NB-7233)
 1983 – Dangerous (Columbia Records #FC-38817)
 1986 – Tony Joe White Live! (Dixiefrog [France] Records #DFG-8407) – a live recording from 1971.
 1991 – Closer to the Truth (Remark Records/Polydor #511 386–2; also on Swamp Records #723-2)
 1993 – The Path Of A Decent Groove (Remark Records/Polydor #519 938–2)
 1993 – The Best Of Tony Joe White Featuring Polk Salad Annie (Warner Bros. Records #45305) – CD compilation
 1995 – Lake Placid Blues (Remark Records/Polydor #527 530–2)
 1997 – Collection (RDM Festival [Australia] Records #D-31737) – compilation
 1998 – Live In Europe 1971 (Wise Buy Records #WB-885972; also on Delta Music #MCPS-23114) – a release of earlier live and possibly bootleg concert material.
 1998 – Groupie Girl (Movieplay/Intermusic #MPG 74023) – another release of earlier live and possibly bootleg concert material.
 1999 – One Hot July (Remark Records/Polydor #558 894–2; reissued on Hip-O Records/Mercury #562 720–2)
 2000 – Greatest Hits And More (Polydor [Netherlands] Records #541 396–2) – 2CD compilation
 2000 – Tony Joe White In Concert (Brilliant [UK] Records #BT-33053) – a live recording from 1969 or 1970. *** NOTE: this material has also been issued as Hard To Handle on Fruit Tree [Italy] Records #FT-836; as Polk Salad Annie Live on Wonderful Music Of [Netherlands] Records #90382; and as Night Of The Moccasin (#250022) and Take Home The Swamp (#250096) on Music Avenue [Belgium] Records.
 2001 – The Beginning (Swamp Records #82268 55520 21; reissued on Audium Records/Koch #8139)
 2002 – Snakey (Swamp Records #75887 70724 21; also on Munich [Netherlands] Records #MRCD-241)
 2003 – Dangerous Eyes (Raven [Australia] Records #RVCD-159) – CD reissue/compilation of 1976's Eyes and 1983's Dangerous.
 2004 – The Heroines (Sanctuary Records #06076 86366 20)
 2006 – Live From Austin TX (New West Records #NW-6092) – a live recording from 1980.
 2006 – Uncovered (Swamp Records #75887 70724 38; also on Munich [Netherlands] Records #MRCD-279)
 2006 – Swamp Music: The Complete Monument Recordings (Rhino Handmade Records #RHM2 7731) – limited edition 4-CD box set compilation
 2008 – Live At The Basement (ZYX/Pepper Records #PEC-20392) – a live recording from 2002.
 2008 – Deep Cuts (Swamp Records #75887 70834 34; also on Munich [Netherlands] Records #MRCD-295)
 2010 – The Shine (Swamp Records #82268 57220 28; also on Munich [Netherlands] Records #MRCD-323)
 2010 – That On The Road Look 'Live' (Rhino Handmade Records #RHM2 542696) – reissue of the Dixiefrog release.
 2010 – Live In Amsterdam (Munich [Netherlands] Records #MRCD-325) – CD + DVD combo
 2011 – Tony Joe White Collection (Cargo [Germany] Records #87121 770583 10) – 3CD compilation
 2012 – Collected (Universal [Poland] Music #6007 533767 06) – 3CD compilation
 2013 – Hoodoo (Yep Roc Records #2348)
 2015 – The Complete Warner Bros. Recordings (Real Gone Music #8480 640032 98) – 2CD compilation
 2015 – Swamp Fox: The Definitive Collection 1968–1973 (Union Square [UK] Records #6984 588225 29) – 2CD compilation
 2016 – Rain Crow (Yep Roc Records #2450)
 2018 – Bad Mouthin (Yep Roc Records #2593)
2021 – Smoke from the Chimney'' (Easy Eye Sound)

References

External links 
 Official website

1943 births
2018 deaths
People from Oak Grove, Louisiana
American male singer-songwriters
Swamp rock musicians
Warner Records artists
Monument Records artists
Singer-songwriters from Louisiana
American harmonica players
Guitarists from Louisiana
American male guitarists
Yep Roc Records artists
Polydor Records artists
Sanctuary Records artists